Habib Akdaş was a Turkish citizen born in Batman. He was trained in Al Qaeda training camps in Afghanistan.  He returned to Turkey and was named as emir of an Al Qaeda unit in Turkey which carried out the 2003 Istanbul bombings. Afterwards, he went to Iraq, and joined Al Qaeda in Iraq organization, and he was killed after an American air strike on his house.

References 
 

Turkish al-Qaeda members
2004 deaths
Deaths by American airstrikes